Larry Ragland is an American professional offroad racing competitor and 5 time SCORE International Baja 1000 Trophy Truck overall winner. "Lightning" Larry Ragland is the second most winning driver in desert racing's history and a Trophy Truck expert.

Personal life
Larry Ragland was born December 22, 1943. He had a son named Chad and currently lives in Cave Creek, Ariz. His son Chad recently died after a lengthy battle with Leukemia.

Racing career

1980s
 1981 1st career race win at Parker 400.
 1981 1st SCORE Baja 500 win, and 1st SCORE San Felipe 250 win (class and overall).
 1982 SCORE Baja 500, winner (class and overall).
 1983 Barstow Desert Classic, and SCORE San Felipe 250 winner (class and overall).
 1983 SCORE Class 1 championship.
 1984 SCORE Baja 500 and Frontier 500 (class and overall).
 1984 2nd consecutive SCORE Class 1 championship.
 1985 Frontier 500 2nd consecutive win (class and overall).
 1986 Mint 400 winner (class and overall).
 1987 Riverside Off-Road World Championships (short course) winner.
 1988 Parker 400, Mint 400, Nevada 500 and consecutive Riverside Off-Road World Championships (short course) champion (class and overall).
 1988 SCORE Class 7 championship.
 1989 Barstow Fireworks 250 winner.

1990s
 1990 Mid-Winter Championships, Phoenix World Championships, and the Parker 400 winner (class and overall).
 1991 SCORE Baja 500, Parker 400, SCORE San Felipe 250, Nevada 500, and Gold Coast 300 winner.
 1991 1st SCORE Baja 1000 win (class 8 and overall).
 1991 SCORE Heavy Metal and SCORE Class 8 championships.
 1992 Mint 400 and Nevada 500 winner (class and overall).
 1992 2nd consecutive SCORE Heavy Metal and SCORE Class 8 championships.
 1993 Gold Coast 300 (class and overall).
 1995 San Felipe 250 winner (class and overall).
 1995 SCORE Baja 1000 winner (2nd career)(class and overall).
 1996 SCORE Baja 1000 winner (3rd career)(2nd straight)(class and overall).
 1997 Pikes Peak Rookie of the Year.
 1997 SCORE Baja 1000 winner (4th career)(3rd straight)(class and overall).
 1998 Atlas Rally and Pikes Peak Super Stock Truck-Hill Climb winner.
 1999 Pikes Peak Overall Fastest Vehicle up the Mountain - honors.
 1999 Pikes Peak Super Stock Truck-Hill Climb - winner (class and overall).
 1999 SCORE Baja 1000 winner (5th career)(class and overall).

2000s
 2000 SCORE Baja 500 and Parker 400 - winner (class and overall).
 2002 SCORE Baja 500 - winner (class).
 2005 SCORE Primm 300, BITD Terrible’s Town 250, SNORE Buffalo Bills 400, and BITD Nevada 1000 - winner (class and overall).
 2006 BITD Vegas-to-Reno - winner (class and overall).
 2006 SCORE Baja 500 - winner (class and overall).
 2007 SCORE Baja 500 - winner (class and overall).
 2008 SCORE Baja 1000 - 3rd overall with son, Chad Ragland

Norman Motorsports

In 2008 Ragland joined Larry Roeseler and Rhys Millen on the Norman Motorsports team as co-driver of Trophy Truck #8.

Hall of Fame
In 2016, Ragland was inducted in the Off-Road Motorsports Hall of Fame.

Video Game Credits
Ragland was featured in the 2001 video game 'Larry Ragland's 4x4 Challenge'.

Notes

External links
 Norman Motorsports 
 Larry Ragland Google Videos
 YouTube Team Videos
 Facebook Team Page

1943 births
Living people
People from Irvine, California
Off-road racing drivers